Domestic Railway Station can refer to:

The railway station in Sydney, Australia: Domestic railway station, Sydney
The railway station in Brisbane, Australia: Domestic Terminal railway station, Brisbane